This is a list of winners of one or more Superbike World Championship races, since the championship was established in 1988.

By rider

By nationality

By manufacturer

References

World Superbike race winners
race winners